"The Rocker" is a song by Irish rock group Thin Lizzy, included on their 1973 album Vagabonds of the Western World. It was also released as a single in a 2:41 edited format, the original album track stretching to 5:17, most of the extra length being taken up by an extended guitar solo by Eric Bell. There is an accompanying performance on Dutch TV programme TopPop to the song which features Gary Moore recorded in 1974 during his first of two spells with the band.

The B-side of the single in most territories was the album track "Here I Go Again", but in Germany the non-album track, "A Ride in the Lizzy Mobile", was used. This track later appeared on the four-CD box set Vagabonds, Kings, Warriors, Angels as "Cruising in the Lizzy Mobile".

The single failed to chart in the UK, but reached No. 11 in Ireland and spent four weeks in the chart. However, it became a live favourite and was one of the few songs from Eric Bell's time with the band to survive his departure and become part of the live repertoire of the Brian Robertson/Scott Gorham lineup (who performed the song in a lower key than the original). It was the final track on the band's 1978 live album Live and Dangerous.

The song was remixed for the PlayStation 3 video game Gran Turismo 5: Prologue.

Raven have covered the song for their 1994 album Glow.

The song is featured in the soundtrack of the 2013 film Rush.

British heavy metal band Saxon covered the song on their 2021 album of covers, Inspirations.

Personnel
Phil Lynott – bass guitar, lead vocals
Eric Bell – lead guitar
Brian Downey – drums

References

Thin Lizzy songs
1973 singles
Songs written by Phil Lynott